Frederick D. Schmidt (June 30, 1932 – July 18, 2003) was an American politician who served in the New York State Assembly from 1965 to 1972 and from 1975 to 1992.

He died of a heart attack on July 18, 2003, in Queens, New York City, New York at age 71. The running track of Victory Field in Forest Park in Queens was named after him in 2007.

References

1932 births
2003 deaths
Democratic Party members of the New York State Assembly
20th-century American politicians